David Muta (born 24 October 1987) is a Papua New Guinean footballer who plays for Hekari United and the Papua New Guinea national football team. He captains both his club and the Papua New Guinea national team.

Club career 
Muta started his playing career with Hekari United in 2006. Two years later, he joined Australian club Sunshine Coast FC and helped his side to win the Queensland State League title.

On 6 December 2008, he played against LA Galaxy in an exhibition match in New Zealand, as part of an Oceania XI All-Star team.

After moving back to Papua New Guinea, Muta captained Hekari United to victory in the OFC Champions League in 2010 and guided the team to the 2010 FIFA Club World Cup in the United Arab Emirates. At the first match of the tournament, he played the full 90 minutes for his side in the 3–0 defeat to Al Wahda.

International career 
Muta represented Papua New Guinea's under-23 team at the 2008 OFC Men's Olympic Football Tournament in Fiji, where he scored 2 goals.

On 27 August 2011, Muta made his senior international debut in a 2011 Pacific Games against Cook Islands, scoring in the 4–0 victory.

Muta was named as captain of Papua New Guinea for the 2016 OFC Nations Cup on home soil. He played in all games and helped his country reach the final for the first time in their history. Despite losing in the final to New Zealand, he was awarded the Golden Ball as the tournament's best player.

International goals 
Scores and results list Papua New Guinea's goal tally first.

Honours

Club
Hekari United
Papua New Guinea National Soccer League: 
Champions: 2006, 2007–08, 2008–09, 2009–10, 2010–11, 2011–12, 2013, 2014
OFC Champions League: 
Champions: 2009–10

Sunshine Coast FC
Queensland State League:
Champions: 2008

Individual
OFC Nations Cup Golden Ball: 2016

References

External links

1987 births
Living people
Papua New Guinean footballers
Association football defenders
Hekari United players
Sunshine Coast F.C. players
Papua New Guinean expatriate footballers
Expatriate soccer players in Australia
Papua New Guinean expatriate sportspeople in Australia
2012 OFC Nations Cup players
2016 OFC Nations Cup players
People from West New Britain Province
Papua New Guinea international footballers